Rudolf Forster (30 October 1884 – 25 October 1968) was an Austrian film actor. He appeared in more than 100 films between 1914 and 1968. His autobiography Das Spiel, mein Leben was published by Propyläen Verlag in 1967. He was born in Gröbming, Austria, and died in Bad Aussee, Austria, five days before his 84th birthday.

Selected filmography

 Lepain (1914, 1920, part 1-6) - Detektiv
 Das Bild der Ahnfrau (1916)
 Frauenruhm (1920)
 Glanz und Elend der Kurtisanen (1920) - Lucien de Rubempré / Léon Montaguard
 Der Schieberkönig (1920)
 Kurfürstendamm (1920) - Ernst Duffer
 Fanny Elssler (1920) - Gentz
 Manolescu's Memoirs (1920) - Alfons, deren Verlobter
 Princess Woronzoff (1920)
 Moj (1920)
 The Skull of Pharaoh's Daughter (1920) - Dr. Pflüger
 Der Schädel der Pharaonentochter (1920)
 Anna Karenina (1920) - Graf Ljevin
 Der Mann mit den drei Frauen (1920)
 10 Millionen Volt (1921)
 Die rote Hexe (1921)
 The Red Masquerade Ball (1921)
 Das Geheimnis der Gladiatorenwerke (1921, part 1, 2) - Morlang
 The Amazon (1921)
 Love at the Wheel (1921)
 Das Geheimnis der Santa Maria (1921)
 The Hunt for the Truth (1921)
 The Eternal Curse (1921) - Lyn
 The Adventurer (1922) - Bergström
 Frau Sünde (1922)
 Die Schuhe einer schönen Frau (1922) - Casanova
 At the Edge of the Great City (1922)
 Between Day and Dream (1922) - Graf Cederström
 The Inheritance (1922)
 Earth Spirit (1923) - Alwa Schoen
 The Men of Sybill (1923)
 Fridericus Rex (1923, part 4) - Vorleser von Catt
 Lyda Ssanin (1923)
 Adam and Eve (1923)
 Resurrection (1923)
 Tragedy of Love (1923) - Francois Moreau
 The Countess of Paris (1923) - Graf François Moreau
 The Island of Tears (1923) - Harry - Offizier der amerik. Marine
 Fröken Fob (1923) - Horace Milltorp
 Die Sonne von St. Moritz (1923)
 Marionettes of the Princess (1924)
 Horrido (1924)
 Die Jagd nach der Frau (1924)
 Chronicles of the Gray House (1925) - Junker Detlef
 His Toughest Case (1926) - Francis Broon
 The Trousers (1927) - Scarron
 Assassination (1927) - Gregor von Askanius
 The Queen of Spades (1927) - Tomski - ein Spieler
 The Threepenny Opera (1931) - Mackie Messer
 Ariane (1931) -  Konstantin Michael
 Yorck (1931) - King Friedrich Wilhelm III of Prussia
 The Countess of Monte Cristo (1932) - Rumowski, Hochstapler
 Dreaming Lips (1932) - Michael Marsden
 Morgenrot (1933) - Kapitanleutnant Helmut Liers
 Hohe Schule (1934) - Carlo Cavelli & Graf Werffen
 Santa Joanna D'Arc (1935)
 ... nur ein Komödiant (1935) - Herzog Friedrich Theodor / Florian Reiter
 Such Great Foolishness (1937) - Dr. Alexander Dahlen
 Island of Lost Men (1939) - Prof. Sen
 Vienna 1910 (1943) - Mayor Dr. Karl Lueger
 Der gebieterische Ruf (1944) - Hofrat Dr. Wichmann
 Ein Blick zurück (1944) - Dr. Eugen Friderici, Rechtsanwalt
 Journey to Happiness (1948) - Konsul Hoyermann
 The Man Who Wanted to Live Twice (1950) - Professor Hesse
 Die Tödlichen Träume (1951) - Opitz / E.T.A. Hoffmann / Gefreiter
 Immortal Light (1951) - Graf Kalinsky
 The White Horse Inn (1952) - Kaiser Franz Josef
 Viktoria und ihr Husar (1954)
 Captain Wronski (1954) - Oberst Maty
 Espionage (1955) - Chef des Generalstabes, von Heymeneck
 One Woman Is Not Enough? (1955) - Justizrat Dr. Kern
 The Last Man (1955) - Herr Claasen
 Regine (1956) - Geheimrat Hansen
 Winter in the Woods (1956) - Baron Malte
 Liane, Jungle Goddess (1956) - Theo Amelongen
 Kaiserjäger (1956) - Graf Leopold Hardberg, General a.D.
 Die unentschuldigte Stunde (1957) - Prof. Dr. Weiringk
 Spielbank-Affäre (1957) - Gallinger
 And Lead Us Not Into Temptation (1957) - von Hausen
 Scandal in Bad Ischl (1957) - Fürst Emanuel
  (1958) - Dr. Clemens Herborth
 Eva (1959) - Hofrat von Leitner
 The Rest Is Silence (1959) - Sanitätsrat Dr. Max von Pohl
  (1958) - Konsul Hackrath
 Beloved Augustin (1960) - Dr. Mesmer
 A Glass of Water (1960) - Marquis de Torcy
 Brainwashed (1960) - Hotel Manager
 Der Teufel spielte Balalaika (1961) - Admiral
 Das Riesenrad (1961) - Hofrat von Hill
 Via Mala (1961) - Maler Matthias
 The Return of Doctor Mabuse (1961) - Professor Julius Sabrehm
 Liane, die Tochter des Dschungels (1961)
 Lulu (1962) - Schigolch
 He Can't Stop Doing It (1962) - Bischof
 Moral 63 (1963) - Der General a.D.
 Der Henker von London (1963) - Sir Francis Elliott - Ann's Father
 The Cardinal (1963) - Drunk Man at the Ball
 The Curse of the Hidden Vault (1964) - Real
 Tonio Kröger (1964) - Herr Seehaase
 The Blood of the Walsungs (1965) - Graf / count Arnstatt
 Pleins feux sur Stanislas (1965) - Rameau
 Once a Greek (1966)
 Der Turm der verbotenen Liebe (1968) - Honoré de Latoure
 Von Haut zu Haut (1971) - Trodler

References

External links

Rudolf Forster at Virtual History

1884 births
1968 deaths
People from Liezen District
Austrian male film actors
Austrian male silent film actors
20th-century Austrian male actors